John Walter Cressy-Hall (4 August 1843 – 7 April 1894) was an English first-class cricketer and merchant.

The son of the physician Alfred Hall, John was born at Brighton in August 1843. He was educated there at Brighton College. After completing his education, Cressy-Hall became a merchant. He played first-class cricket for the Marylebone Cricket Club on three occasions, playing against Cambridge University in 1873, Derbyshire in 1878, and Hampshire in 1880. He scored 27 runs in these matches, in addition to taking two wickets. By 1894, Cressy-Hall was living in poverty at Kimberley in South Africa. He was financially supported by his younger brother, Sir Edward Marshall Hall, who sent money to him via Archdeacon Gaul. The two were not on good terms, with Cressy-Hall resenting being financially supported by his younger brother, to the extent that he sent offensive correspondences to him back in England. Cressy-Hall was found dead in his bed on 7 April 1894 at Kimberley.

References

External links

1843 births
1894 deaths
Sportspeople from Brighton
People educated at Brighton College
English merchants
English cricketers
Marylebone Cricket Club cricketers
English emigrants to South Africa
19th-century English businesspeople